Malta competed at the 2000 Summer Olympics in Sydney, Australia.

Results by event

Athletics
Men's 100 m
 Mario Bonello
 Round 1 – 11.06 (→ did not advance, 85th place)

Women's 100 m
 Suzanne Spiteri
 Round 1 – 12.57 (→ did not advance, 69th place)

Sailing
Open laser
 Mario Aquilina
 Race 1 – (40)
 Race 2 – (41)
 Race 3 – 25 
 Race 4 – 33 
 Race 5 – 30 
 Race 6 – 35 
 Race 7 – 9 
 Race 8 – 35 
 Race 9 – 32 
 Race 10 – 36 
 Race 11 – 37 
 Final – 272 (→ 37th place)

Swimming
Men's 400m Individual Medley
 John Tabone
Preliminary Heat – 4:53.12 (→ did not advance)

Women's 100m Butterfly
 Angela Galea
Preliminary Heat – 1:07.88 (→ did not advance)

References

Wallechinsky, David (2004). The Complete Book of the Summer Olympics (Athens 2004 Edition). Toronto, Canada. . 
International Olympic Committee (2001). The Results. Retrieved 12 November 2005.
Sydney Organising Committee for the Olympic Games (2001). Official Report of the XXVII Olympiad Volume 1: Preparing for the Games. Retrieved 20 November 2005.
Sydney Organising Committee for the Olympic Games (2001). Official Report of the XXVII Olympiad Volume 2: Celebrating the Games. Retrieved 20 November 2005.
Sydney Organising Committee for the Olympic Games (2001). The Results. Retrieved 20 November 2005.
International Olympic Committee Web Site

Nations at the 2000 Summer Olympics
2000 Summer Olympics
2000 in Maltese sport